Eugène Jean Marie Arnaudeau (8 September 1821 – 3 May 1891) was a French army officer who later became a Senator of the Third Republic.

Birth and military career

Eugène Jean Marie Arnaudeau was born on 8 September 1821 in Sèvres-Anxaumont, Vienne.
He graduated from the Ecole polytechnique and became an officer of the engineers.
He advanced steadily through the ranks of the army, becoming sub-lieutenant in 1843, lieutenant in 1845, captain in 1849, battalion commander on 17 January 1855 and lieutenant colonel on 21 January 1860.
In 1861 he married Marie-Félicité Creuzé.

Arnaudeau was promoted to colonel on 16 May 1863 and brigadier general of the infantry on 27 February 1868.
His first campaigns were in Africa.
On 7 June 1865 he was made a Commander of the Legion of Honour.
During the Franco-Prussian War (19 July 1870 – 10 May 1871) he commanded a brigade in the 3rd Corps under Bazaine.
After this he commanded the Angoulême brigade. He was made a divisional general on 30 December 1875 and commanded the 16th Infantry Division, including the subdivisions from Cosne, Bourges and Nevers.

Political career

In 1877 Arnaudeau was Conservative candidate in the senatorial by-election for Vienne that followed the death of Louis Olivier Bourbeau, former Minister of Education.
He was elected on 2 December 1877. He sat on the right and voted with the Conservatives.
He was reelected on 8 January 1882.
He made his last speech in 1889 during the debate over the amnesty law.
Arnaudeau failed to be reelected to the Senate on 4 January 1891, and retired.

Home town

Arnaudeau owned the property of "La Brunetière" in Sèvres-Anxaumont, Vienne.
While in the military he used his leave periods to improve the mansion, adding a tower from which he could use powerful binoculars to watch the military maneuvers at Poitiers.
In 1876 he erected a building in Sèvres to hold the town hall, school and teacher's residence, with a garden.
He was made Mayor of Sèvres in 1888.
He undertook agricultural experiments, trying to apply scientific concepts of the age.
These included applying lime to the land, and a lime kiln still exists at Sèvres today.
He died there on 3 May 1891.
With no descendants, he left all his property to the commune.

References
Citations

Sources

1821 births
1891 deaths
French generals
French military personnel of the Franco-Prussian War
Commandeurs of the Légion d'honneur
Senators of Vienne